Khlong Prawet Buri Rom is a khlong (canal) in east Bangkok.

After the khlong construction bill was promulgated in 1877, King Chulalongkorn (Rama V) ordered the extension of Khlong Phra Khanong to join Khlong Dan and link to the Bang Pakong River of Chachoengsao Province. The khlong was called Khlong Prawet Buri Rom. Excavations took three years to complete. The man-made khlong not only enabled water transportation between  Nakhon Khuean Khan (present day Samut Prakan Province) and Chachoengsao, but it opened up new croplands along its banks.

Although Khlong Prawet Buri Rom has the potential to be a cultural and lifestyle attraction in Bangkok, as recently as 2015 it was avoided by locals "...as the water is too disgusting." The canal flows past Wat Krathum Suea Pla in Prawet District, Hua Takhe Market in Lat Krabang District, and Khlong Suan 100 Years Market, a 100-year-old traditional market on the border of Samut Prakan and Chachoengsao.

References

Canals in Thailand
Lat Krabang district
Prawet district
Samut Prakan province
Chachoengsao province
Canals opened in 1880